A posthumous birth is the birth of a child after the death of a biological parent. A person born in these circumstances is called a posthumous child or a posthumously born person. Most instances of posthumous birth involve the birth of a child after the death of its father, but the term is also applied to infants delivered shortly after the death of the mother, usually by caesarean section.

Legal implications
Posthumous birth has special implications in law, potentially affecting the child's citizenship and legal rights, inheritance, and order of succession. Legal systems generally include special provisions regarding inheritance by posthumous children and the legal status of such children. For example, Massachusetts law states that a posthumous child is treated as having been living at the death of the parent, meaning that the child receives the same share of the parent's estate as if the child had been born before the parent's death.

Another emerging legal issue in the United States is the control of genetic material after the death of the donor. United States law holds that posthumous children of U.S. citizens who are born outside the United States have the same rights to citizenship that they would have had if the deceased U.S. citizen parent had been alive at the time of their birth.  In the field of assisted reproduction, snowflake children, i.e.  those "adopted" as frozen embryos by people unrelated to them, can result in the birth of a child after the death of one or both of their genetic parents.

In monarchies and nobilities
A posthumous birth has special significance in the case of hereditary monarchies and hereditary noble titles following primogeniture. In this system, a monarch's or peer's own child precedes that monarch's or peer's sibling in the order of succession. In cases where the widow of a childless king or nobleman is pregnant at the time of his death, the next-in-line is not permitted to assume the throne or title, but must yield place to the unborn child, or ascends and reigns (in the case of a monarch) or succeeds (in the case of a peer) until the child is born.

In monarchies and noble titles that follow male-preference cognatic primogeniture, the situation is similar where the dead monarch or peer was not childless but left a daughter as the next-in-line, as well as a pregnant widow. A posthumous brother would supplant that daughter in the succession, whereas a posthumous sister, being younger, would not. Similarly, in monarchies and noble titles that follow agnatic primogeniture, the sex of the unborn child determines the succession; a posthumous male child would himself succeed, whereas the next-in-line would succeed upon the birth of a posthumous female child.

Modern complications
Posthumous conception by artificial insemination or in vitro fertilization, whether done using sperm or ova stored before a parent's death or sperm retrieved from a man's corpse, has created new legal issues. When a woman is inseminated with her deceased husband's sperm, laws that establish that a sperm donor is not the legal father of the child born as a result of artificial insemination have had the effect of excluding the deceased husband from fatherhood and making the child legally fatherless.

In the United Kingdom before 2000, birth records of children conceived using a dead man's sperm had to identify the infants as fatherless, but in 2000 the government announced that the law would be changed to allow the deceased father's name to be listed on the birth certificate. In 1986, a New South Wales legal reform commission recommended that the law should recognize the deceased husband as the father of a child born from post-mortem artificial insemination, provided that the woman is his widow and unmarried at the time of birth, but the child should have inheritance rights to the father's estate only if the father left a will that included specific provisions for the child.

In 2001, the Massachusetts Supreme Judicial Court was asked to consider whether the father's name should appear on the birth record for a child conceived through artificial insemination after her father's death, as well as whether that child was eligible for U.S. Social Security benefits. The court ruled in January 2002 that a child could be the legal heir of a dead parent if there was a genetic relationship and the deceased parent had both agreed to the posthumous conception and committed to support the child. Different U.S. state courts and federal appellate courts have ruled differently in similar cases. In 2012, the U.S. Supreme Court ruled in Astrue v. Capato that twins born 18 months after their father's death using the father's frozen sperm were not eligible for Social Security benefits, which set a new precedent.

Naming
In the Middle Ages, it was traditional for posthumous children born in England to be given a matronymic surname instead of a patronymic one. This may in part explain why matronyms are more common in England than in other parts of Europe.

In Ancient Rome, posthumous children of noble birth were often given the cognomen (or third name) 'Postumus.' One example is Agrippa Postumus. 

In Yoruba culture, posthumous children are given names that referred to the circumstances concerning the birth. Examples of this include Bàbárímisá, meaning that the Father saw (the child) and ran, Yeyérínsá, meaning that the Mother saw (the child) and ran, Ikúdáyísí (or any name with the root dáyísí, which means that death spared the child), and Ẹnúyàmí, meaning that "I was surprised," referring to the fact that the tragic death of the father, mother, or both was sudden and surprising for the family.

Notable people born posthumously

Antiquity

Middle Ages

Age of Discovery

19th century

20th century

Religious and mythological people born posthumously

The Bible's Old Testament mentions two named cases of posthumous children:
Ashhur, youngest son of Hezron, born when his father had died when aged past 60 years. (1 Chronicles 2:21, 24)
Ichabod, who was born when his mother, who subsequently died, heard news that his father Phinehas had been killed at the Battle of Aphek and paternal grandfather Eli accidentally killed afterwards. (1 Samuel 4:19–22)

Parikshit, the sole survivor of the Kuru dynasty in Mahabharata, was born after his father Abhimanyu was killed in the Kurukshetra war. 

The Greek god Asclepius is said to have been delivered by caesarean section after his mother was killed on Mount Olympus.

Fictional characters born posthumously

Macduff, a character in Shakespeare's Macbeth, revealed that he was not literally born, but removed from his [dead] mother, completing a plot twist.
The Irish Republican song "The Broad Black Brimmer" was about a boy whose father died before he was born.
The Charles Dickens character David Copperfield was a posthumous child, whose father had died six months before he was born. Another Dickens character, Oliver Twist, was posthumous as his mother died while giving birth.
On A Nightmare on Elm Street 5: The Dream Child, baby Jacob was born after his father Dan was killed by Freddy.
In The Hunger Games series, Gale Hawthorne's sister Posy is born shortly after their father dies in a mine explosion, and Finnick Odair's son is born months after his death in battle.
John Connor, a principal character in the Terminator franchise, and son of Sarah Connor and Kyle Reese (a time traveler from the future), was conceived shortly before his father was killed. As an adult, John was in fact responsible for selecting Reese (who was unaware of their relation) to go back in time.
The Noughts and Crosses series character Callie-Rose Hadley is born after the execution of her father, Callum McGregor.
In the British television soap opera Coronation Street, Liam Connor Jr. was born in July 2009; his father and namesake Liam Connor, was ordered murdered by Tony Gordon just a short time after Liam Jr.'s conception in October 2008.
The Stephen King novel Carrie tells briefly of the parents of the titular character, Margaret and Ralph White. Ralph, a construction worker, had impregnated Margaret, only to be killed in a construction accident shortly before the birth of their daughter.
In Berserk, the main character Guts is found after having been birthed by a hanging corpse.
Grey's Anatomy: Derek Shepherd dies in a car accident in Season 11, nine months before the birth of his daughter.
Bahubali series: Mahendra Bahubali is born shortly after his father Amarendra Bahubali is killed.
Star Wars Rebels: Kanan Jarrus dies sacrificing himself while rescuing his lover Hera Syndulla who is pregnant with their son, Jacen Syndulla.
In A Song of Ice and Fire, Princess Daenerys Targaryen is born months after the death of her father, King Aerys II Targaryen.
Avatar series: Grace Augustine's human form was killed by Colonel Miles Quaritch, but her unconscious Avatar body was kept in stasis and later gave birth to Kiri.

See also
Coffin birth
Maternal death
Posthumous sperm retrieval

References

External links

Posthumous Child (i.e., Born After Father's Death), Adoption.com

Posthumous birth
Inheritance